is a Japanese manga series written and illustrated by Koume Fujichika. The series was first published on the author's Twitter account in April 2018 before being serialized in Square Enix's Monthly Gangan Joker magazine in November of that same year. Its chapters have been collected in ten tankōbon volumes as of January 2023. An anime television series adaptation by GoHands is set to premiere in July 2023.

Plot 
As the deskmate of Ai Mie, Kaede Komura always has his attention fixed on her. Attracted by her cute charms, all he wishes for is that she would look at him with those beautiful eyes beneath her glasses. But just a few days after making her acquaintance, Kaede notices something different about Ai: her eyes are squinting and her glasses are missing. Nonetheless, he still finds her adorable.

Unexpectedly, Ai has a tendency to forget her glasses. Having terrible vision, she has difficulty going through her day at school. Thankfully, Kaede is more than willing to help her. As Ai starts relying on him, Kaede's feelings for her grow even more. Likewise, despite her short-sightedness, Kaede slowly becomes the person Ai always hopes to see.

Characters 

Komura is a shy, good-natured middle-school boy. He has had a crush on Mie since the first days of school, but because of his fear of being rejected, it is difficult for him to confess his love to her. He loves playing games, especially those at the arcade. Komura is described by Mie as kind and helpful like her father. Apparently, he first met his future crush Mie way back when they were both 8, at an ice-cream shop.

An absentminded middle-school girl who always forgets her glasses. She can manage to get to school without her glasses thanks to her house being close to it. She sometimes speaks like a warrior which has been passed onto her by her father. She loves visiting the aquarium and learning about sea creatures. Whenever Mie forgets her glasses, she loses the perception of distance, and thus she tends to lean in close to Komura in order to see his face clearly, making the boy blush.

Komura and Mie's classmate. He is the popular kid at school. Due to his appearance and gentleness, he often receives confession from girls, to which he always kindly rejects. He sometimes tries to help Mie, which makes Komura feel jealous and self-conscious.

Komura and Mie's classmate. She is a girl with pigtails who, on a few occasions, makes Mie feel jealous because either Komura tries to help her or he accidentally gets too close to her.

One of Komura's closest friends. Komura is regularly caught staring at Mie by him.

One of Mie's closest friends who is often seen going with her. 

Komura and Mie's classmate. She also has bad eyesight. On one occasion, she helps Mie with wearing contact lens in the sports festival.

Komura and Mie's classmate. He wears a pair of glasses and has a chubby appearance.

A former classmate of Mie. He used to steal her glasses when they were in elementary school.

Media

Manga 
The Girl I Like Forgot Her Glasses is written and illustrated by Koume Fujichika. Fujichika initially launched the series as a webcomic on their Twitter account in 2018. It later began serialization in Square Enix's Monthly Gangan Joker on November 22, 2018. Square Enix has collected its chapters into individual tankōbon volumes. The first volume was released on February 22, 2019. As of January 20, 2023, ten volumes have been released. The series is licensed in English digitally by Comikey and in print by Square Enix.

Anime 
An anime television series was announced on January 13, 2023. It is produced by GoHands and directed by Katsumasa Yokomine, with chief direction by Susumu Kudo, scripts written by Tamazo Yanagi, character designs by Takayuki Uchida, and music composed by Jimmy Thumb P. The series is set to premiere in July 2023 on Tokyo MX and other networks.

Reception 
In 2019, the manga was ranked 12th in the print category of the Next Manga Awards out of 50 nominees.

See also 
Tonari no Onee-san ga Suki, another manga series by the same author

Notes

References

External links 
  at Square Enix 
  
 

Anime series based on manga
Gangan Comics manga
GoHands
Romantic comedy anime and manga
Slice of life anime and manga
Shōnen manga
Upcoming anime television series